Chu Kwok-keung is a Hong Kong teacher and pro-Beijing politician, elected as a member of Legislative Council in 2021.

Chu currently serves as the vice-chairman Hong Kong Federation of Education Workers, a pro-Beijing teachers union, and as a secondary school principal. Chu supported teachers pledging allegiance to the Chinese Government, and rejected calls of quashing criminal records of students arrested during protests.

In September 2022, after a 57% yearly increase in the number of reduced classes due to an emigration wave of students from Hong Kong to other cities, Chu suggested filling up the classes with mainland Chinese students.

Electoral performances

References 

Hong Kong educators
Living people
Year of birth missing (living people)
HK LegCo Members 2022–2025
Members of the Election Committee of Hong Kong, 2021–2026